Canadian Forces Base Esquimalt (CFB Esquimalt) is Canada's Pacific Coast naval base and home port to Maritime Forces Pacific and Joint Task Force Pacific Headquarters. , 4,411 military personnel and 2,762 civilians work at CFB Esquimalt.

Geography 

Facilities 
CFB Esquimalt comprises facilities that include Naden (formerly HMCS Naden), Her Majesty's Canadian (HMC) Dockyard Esquimalt, Fleet Maintenance Facility – Cape Breton (FMF CB), a Fire Fighting and Damage Control School, the Naval Officer Training Centre (NOTC) Venture, and extensive housing including 716 personnel married quarters located at nine sites such as Belmont Park, WorkPoint, and Royal Roads.

The present dockyard and dry dock, known as HMC Dockyard Esquimalt, dates to the Royal Navy's Esquimalt Royal Navy Dockyard (1842–1905) and was the Royal Navy's Pacific Station until 1911. Today it serves as the Canadian Naval Headquarters in the Pacific.

Operational and support units 
Major units of the base are:

 Maritime Forces Pacific
 Naval Security Team
 Joint Task Force Pacific
 Campus Pacific
 Fleet Diving Unit (Pacific)
 443 Maritime Helicopter Squadron
 Canadian Forces Health Services Centre (Pacific)
 Naval Provost Marshal (Pacific)
 5th (British Columbia) Field Artillery Regiment, RCA
 The Canadian Scottish Regiment
 11 Service Battalion
 4th Canadian Rangers Patrol Group
 Acoustic Data Analysis Centre
 Regional Cadets (Pacific)

Historic site 

Due to their significance in Canadian naval history, four sites at CFB Esquimalt (the Dockyard, the former Royal Navy Hospital, the Veterans' Cemetery, and the Cole Island Magazine) have been designated the Esquimalt Naval Sites National Historic Site of Canada.

Ships

 

As of March 2013, CFB Esquimalt services the following ships assigned to Canadian Fleet Pacific 
 patrol frigates
   
  
   
   
 
s
  
  
  
  
  
 
Victoria-class patrol submarines
 
 
 
Auxiliary vessels
 , tugboat
 
 , fireboat   
 s
 CFAV Lawrenceville (YTL 590), tugboat 
 CFAV Parksville (YTL 591), tugboat 
  tugs
 , tugboat 
 , tugboat
  patrol craft training tender
Orca (PCT 55)
Raven (PCT 56)
Caribou (PCT 57)
Renard (PCT 58)
Wolf (PCT 59)
Grizzly (PCT 60)
Cougar (PCT 61)
Moose (PCT 62)

Architecture 

CFB Esquimalt contains several recognized and classified federal heritage buildings on the Register of the Government of Canada Heritage Buildings.

 Colwood Site
 Guard House Building 38 Recognized – 2002
 Belmont Road Main Gatehouse BEL 13 Recognized – 2000
 Cow Barn / Dairy RR6 Recognized – 2000
 Gatehouse Lodge RR8 Recognized – 2000
 Grant Block, Building 24 Recognized – 1990
 Gymnasium RR22 Recognized – 2000
 Hatley Castle Classified – 1986
 Nixon Block RR24A Recognized – 2000
 Stable / Garage RR4 Recognized – 2000
 Swimming Pool RR22A Recognized – 2000
 Dockyard
 Admiral's Residence, former Naval Storekeeper's Residence, Building D101 Classified – 1991
 Aldergrove Building DY 199 Recognized – 2001
 Bickford Tower, Building D118 Recognized – 1988
 Clothing / Receiving Stores, Building D211 Recognized – 1991
 Cordage / Furniture Stores, Building D80 Recognized – 1991
 Dry Dock Pumphouse, Building D175 Recognized – 1991
 Electrical Shop Building DY 141 Recognized – 2001
 Engineer's Residence, Building D1 Recognized – 1991
 Factory, Building 51 Recognized – 1991
 Guard House Building D214 Recognized – 1991
 Main Office, Building D70 Recognized – 1991
 Oil Stores Building D83 Recognized – 1991
 Ordnance Stores, Building D77 Recognized – 1991
 Pump House, Graving Dock No. 1 Recognized – 1991
 Royal Navy Prison, Building D26 Recognized – 1991
 Rum / Salt Meats Stores, Building D75-D76 Recognized – 1991
 Sail Loft / Oil Stores, Building D109 Recognized – 1991
 Shipwrights' Shed / Spar Shed, Building D113 Recognized – 1991
 Stone Frigate Building D38 Recognized – 1991
 Transformer House, Graving Dock No. 11 Recognized – 1991
 Veterans' Cemetery Chapel Recognized – 1996 
 Warehouse Building D85 Recognized – 1986
Fleet Maintenance Facility Cape Breton, Buildings D250 & D252 Recognized – 1991; Final Construction Completed – 2020
 Naden
 Administration Block, Building 37 Recognized – 1990
 Administration Office, former Offices of the Officer-in-Charge, Building 5 Recognized – 1991
 Catholic Chapel, Building 35 Recognized – 1990
 Communications School, Building 67 Recognized – 1991
 Drill Hall Building 33-33A-33B Recognized – 1991
 Gunnery School, former Building 50 Recognized – 1991
 Nelles Block, Building 34 Recognized – 1994
 Officer's Ward / Base Museum, Building 20 Recognized – 1990
 Protestant Chapel Building 39 Recognized – 1990
 Radar Training Building 92A Recognized – 2006
 Stores / Museum Warehouse, Building 29 Recognized – 1990
 Torpedo School, former Building 2 Recognized – 1991
 Trades Training Building 92 Recognized – 2006
 Signal Hill
 Armament Artificer's and Sergeant's Quarters, former Building 522 Recognized – 1991
 Gun Emplacement, Building 578 Recognized – 1990
 Private Married Quarters, former Building 523 Recognized – 1991
 Reserve Ordnance Stores, former Building 508 Recognized – 1991
 Work Point Barracks
 Administration Building 1020 Recognized – 1991
 Artillery Barracks, Building 1075 Recognized – 1991
 Barracks Building 1004 Recognized – 1991
 Work Point Guard House Recognized – 2011

The Institute for Stained Glass in Canada has documented the stained glass at the Multi-Faith Naval Chapel and the stained glass at the Old Naval and Garrison Church (1866), now known as St Paul's Anglican.

Esquimalt Naval and Military Museum 

CFB Esquimalt Naval & Military Museum is located at HMCS Naden. Building 20 (c. 1891), part of Naden Museum Square is a Municipal Heritage Property. Building 37 (c. 1889) part of the Naden Museum Square is also a Municipal Heritage Property and is also on the Canadian Register of Historic Places. HMCS Naden was named after the Dominion Government Ship Naden, which was commissioned as a tender for the Royal Naval College of Canada from 1918 to 1922 for training in sail.  The museum is affiliated with: Canadian Museums Association (CMA),  Canadian Heritage Information Network (CHIN), Organization of Military Museums of Canada (OMMC) and Virtual Museum of Canada.

Other facilities

CFB Esquimalt operates a bus service to provide intra-base transportation.
The Lookout is the base newspaper, which covers local, national and international news with specific interest to Navy and Canadian Forces members and family issues.

Fort Albert Head was established in the late 1800s along with Fort Rodd Hill and other installations, to provide shore defence for the Strait of Juan de Fuca and Victoria Harbour. The training area is used for Regular and Reserve Force training throughout nine months of the year and is home to the Regional Cadet Instructor School (Pacific) that trains Canadian Forces Cadet Instructors Cadre (CIC) Branch that deliver the cadet program. During the summer months of June, July and August the area houses the Albert Head Air Cadet Summer Training Centre. Canadian Forces Maritime Experimental Test Range at Nanoose Bay is also part of CFB Esquimalt. The facility provides non-explosive technical testing of sonobuoys, torpedoes and other equipment. Naval Radio Section Aldergrove in the Fraser Valley houses transmitting and receiving equipment for long-distance communications. Also, the CFB Esquimalt Base Fire Hall & Emergency Response Centre was founded to provide services to CFB Esquimalt and the civil community in the way of fire intervention and emergency response.

Economic facts 
 CFB Esquimalt contributes nearly $600 million into the local community annually.
 CFB Esquimalt is the largest community employer.
 CFB Esquimalt provides 7,866 jobs in the community.
 CFB Esquimalt spends locally 770,847,000 dollars annually.

See also

 Naval Operations Branch

Historical background
 Royal Roads Military College 1940–1995

References

External links 

 Maritime Pacific Command infopage on CFB Esquimalt
 
 CFB Esquimalt – Joint Task Force Pacific Headquarters
 The Look out – CFB Esquimalt newspaper

Esquimalt
History of British Columbia
Greater Victoria
History of the Royal Navy
Heritage sites in British Columbia
National Historic Sites in British Columbia
Canadian Forces Navy bases in Canada
Military history of British Columbia